Dua Lipa (born ) is an English and Albanian  singer and songwriter. Possessing a mezzo-soprano vocal range, Lipa has received numerous accolades, including six Brit Awards, three Grammy Awards, two MTV Europe Music Awards, an MTV Video Music Award, two Billboard Music Awards, an American Music Award, and two Guinness World Records. "No Lie" and "New Rules", each have over 1 billion views on YouTube, with "New Rules" having reached over 2.8 billion views. Her albums Dua Lipa and Future Nostalgia are the most streamed female albums on Spotify with over 10 billion streams each.

After working as a model, she signed with Warner Bros. Records in 2014 and released her first album in 2017. The album peaked at number three on the UK Albums Chart and yielded eight singles, including "Be the One", "IDGAF", and the UK number-one single "New Rules", which also peaked at number six in the US. The album has been certified platinum in numerous countries worldwide and won Lipa the Brit Awards for British Female Solo Artist and British Breakthrough Act in 2018.

Her 2018 single "One Kiss" peaked at number one in the UK and became the years longest-running number-one single by a female artist, winning the 2019 Brit Award for Song of the Year. In 2019, she won the Grammy Award for Best New Artist, as well as the Grammy Award for Best Dance Recording for her Silk City collaboration "Electricity". Later that year, Lipa released "Don't Start Now" as the lead single from her second studio album, Future Nostalgia (2020). Reaching number two in the UK and US, and number four on the US year-end chart, it was the most commercially successful song by a female artist in the US in 2020. Its follow-up singles "Physical", "Break My Heart", and "Levitating" also charted in the top ten, with the lattermost reaching number one on the US year-end chart in 2021.

Future Nostalgia received critical acclaim and earned six Grammy nominations—including Album of the Year, Record of the Year and Song of the Year—and became her first UK number-one album. The album helped Lipa win British Female Solo Artist and British Album of the Year at the 2021 Brit Awards. She was included on the Time 100 Next list in 2021.

Early life
Dua Lipa was born in London, the eldest child of Kosovo Albanian parents Anesa and Dukagjin Lipa from Pristina, FR Yugoslavia (present-day Kosovo). Her family is Muslim. Through her maternal grandmother, she is of Bosniak descent.

Her ancestry can also be traced back to the city of Peja, Kosovo. Both of her grandfathers were historians. She has a sister named Rina and a brother named Gjin. Lipa was musically influenced by her father, who was the lead singer and guitarist of the Kosovan rock band Oda. Her father continued to play music at home, including his own compositions and songs of artists such as David Bowie, Bob Dylan, Radiohead, Sting, the Police and Stereophonics. Lipa started singing at the age of five.

Lipa grew up in West Hampstead, London. She attended Fitzjohn's Primary School, where her music lessons included the cello. When she auditioned to enter the school choir, the teacher told her that "she could not sing". At the age of nine, she began weekend singing lessons at the Sylvia Young Theatre School. Lipa moved with her family to Pristina after Kosovo declared independence in 2008. There, she attended Mileniumi i Tretë School, learned more about the Albanian language and considered a musical career.

Lipa moved back to London at age 15. At Parliament Hill School she passed her A-Levels, then re-entered Sylvia Young Theatre School part-time. She uploaded her own songs to SoundCloud and YouTube. She began posting videos of herself covering songs such as "If I Ain't Got You" (2004) by Alicia Keys and "Beautiful" (2002) by Christina Aguilera on YouTube. Lipa modelled with Topshop and signed with a modelling agency, helping her land a role as a "singer" in an ITV advertisement for The X Factor in 2013, covering the song "Lost in Music" (1979). She acquired a producer and a manager.

Music career

2013–2018: Career beginnings and Dua Lipa

In 2013, Lipa signed a contract with Tap Management, directed by Ben Mawson and Ed Millett, while working as a waitress in a cocktail bar. Lipa was introduced to Mawson by her lawyer, who discouraged her from signing another publishing deal that was offered to her. Subsequently, they offered her a monthly salary to leave her job and focus on recording music. During one of the sessions, Lipa co-wrote the song "Hotter than Hell", which would eventually lead to her signing a record deal with Warner Bros. Records in 2014. Millett retrospectively elaborated: "Dua was really smart – she signed to Warner Bros. partly because they didn't have a big female pop artist and they needed one. They really wanted her, so she had the focus of the team from day one." In August 2015, Lipa released her first single, "New Love", produced by Emile Haynie and Andrew Wyatt. Her second single, "Be the One", was issued to European success in October 2015, reaching number one in Belgium, Poland and Slovakia, as well as charting in the top ten in over eleven European territories. In Australia and New Zealand, the song became an airplay success, reaching numbers 6 and 20 respectively. In November 2015, she was revealed as one of the acts on the BBC Sound of... 2016 long list. Her first tour in the UK and Europe began in January 2016, and concluded in November 2016.
On 18 February 2016, Lipa released her third single, "Last Dance", followed by "Hotter than Hell" on 6 May. The latter was successful, particularly in the UK, where it peaked at number 15. On 26 August, her fifth overall single, "Blow Your Mind (Mwah)", was released, peaking at number 30 in the UK. It became the singer's first entry on the US Billboard Hot 100, debuting at number 72. The song also topped the Billboard Dance Club Songs chart and reached number 23 on the Billboard Mainstream Top 40 chart. Lipa was featured on Sean Paul's single "No Lie", released in November 2016, which reached number ten in the UK. The song became a top-ten hit in ten countries six years after its release, and it became Sean Paul's most-streamed song as of December 2022. The music video (directed by Tim Nackashi) surpassed 1 billion views on YouTube in April 2022, making it Sean Paul's most popular music video as of December 2022. The following month, a documentary about Lipa named See in Blue was commissioned by The Fader magazine. In January 2017, Lipa won the EBBA Public Choice Award, and released the single "Scared to Be Lonely", a collaboration with Martin Garrix, reaching number 14 in the UK. In May 2017, she performed at the anniversary of Indonesian television channel SCTV and won the award for Young and Promising International Artist at the SCTV Music Awards.

Lipa's first album Dua Lipa was released on 2 June 2017. Its sixth single, "New Rules", released in the following month, became Lipa's first number one in the UK, and the first by a female solo artist to reach the top in the UK since Adele's "Hello" in 2015. Her best-selling single to date, the song also charted in the top ten of other countries, including number two in Australia, number six in the US, and number seven in Canada. Lipa performed at the Glastonbury Festival in June. The following month, Lipa performed at the We The Fest, an Indonesian music festival in Jakarta. She performed on BBC's Later... with Jools Holland in October. In December, Lipa was named the most streamed woman of 2017 in the UK by Spotify. She had four singles reach the UK top 10 in 2017, with "Be the One", "New Rules", "No Lie", and "Bridge over Troubled Water", a charity single for the families of the victims of the Grenfell Tower fire in London. In January 2018, Lipa received nominations in five categories at the Brit Awards, more nominations than any other artist that year. She was nominated for MasterCard British Album of the Year for Dua Lipa, British Single of the Year and British Video of the Year for "New Rules", British Female Solo Artist, and British Breakthrough Act, winning the latter two. This was the first time that a female artist had received five nominations.

Lipa performed at the awards ceremony held on 21 February at the O2 Arena in London. The singer collaborated with American DJ Whethan on the song "High" for the Fifty Shades Freed soundtrack, released in February 2018. She started working on new material for her second album in March 2018. On 6 April, Lipa and Calvin Harris released the single "One Kiss", which topped the UK Singles Chart on 20 April, making it Lipa's second number one in the chart; Lipa provided the vocals and is also credited as a writer. The single went on to become the biggest selling song in the UK of 2018 and topped the chart for eight consecutive weeks. She performed in the opening ceremony of the 2018 UEFA Champions League Final in Kyiv on 26 May. It was reported that Lipa would be releasing collaborations with other artists coming out later in 2018, such as one with Mark Ronson and Diplo's newly formed superduo Silk City. Ronson later confirmed the song's title would be "Electricity". The song was released on 9 September. Lipa was also featured in "If Only", a song from Italian singer Andrea Bocelli's sixteenth studio album Sì.

Lipa performed at F1 Singapore Grand Prix in September. In the same month, Lipa endorsed British car brand Jaguar's new electric car, I-PACE. The brand created a remix of Lipa's song "Want To" and launched a service where fans could create their own version of Dua Lipa x Jaguar's song on the Join the Pace website, based on their own driving behaviour or the music they listen to, and share it on social media. According to Lipa's team, Jaguar and Lipa set the world record for the "most remixed song ever". In October, the singer released Dua Lipa: The Complete Edition, an expanded version of her debut album that includes three new songs, including the aforementioned "Want To", and her previous collaborations with other artists. This included a collaboration with South Korean girl group Blackpink called "Kiss and Make Up".

2019–present: Future Nostalgia 
In January 2019, Lipa released the single "Swan Song" as part of the soundtrack to the 2019 film Alita: Battle Angel. That same month, Lipa stated that she spent the preceding year in the writing process for her second studio album. Lipa commented that the album's sound would be a "nostalgic" pop record that "feels like a dancercise class". In August 2019, Lipa partnered with brand Yves Saint Laurent to endorse their fragrance Libre. 

Following the release of its lead single "Don't Start Now", Lipa's second album, Future Nostalgia, and its accompanying tour were announced in December 2019. "Don't Start Now" peaked at number two on both the UK Singles Chart and the US Billboard Hot 100. It also peaked at number one on the US Billboard Mainstream Top 40 chart. Lipa's second single leading up to the release of the album was "Physical". It was released on 30 January 2020 and the song's music video was released a day later. "Physical" debuted at number 60 on the US Billboard Hot 100. Future Nostalgia was released on 27 March to widespread critical acclaim, following the release of the record's third single "Break My Heart" on 25 March. The album debuted at number two on the Official UK Albums Chart, 5550 copies behind 5 Seconds of Summer's Calm. Future Nostalgia peaked at number one on the Official UK Albums Chart the following week in April 2020, while four of the album's singles entered the top ten of the Official Singles Chart. The album holds the record for having the lowest one-week sales while at the top of the chart in the modern era; when it was number one—the week beginning 15 May 2020—the album accumulated a mere 7,317 sales. At the time of the album's release, Lipa became the first British female artist since Vera Lynn to have three top-ten singles in a single calendar year, with Lynn having three in 1952. Lipa eventually overrode this record with the single "Levitating", which also peaked within the top ten on the Billboard Hot 100 chart, becoming her third top-ten in the US overall. Lipa's music video for "Physical" was nominated for Best Art Director at the Berlin Music Video Awards in 2020. The art director of the music video is Anna Colomer Nogué.

On 11 August 2020, she was named global ambassador of the French mineral water brand Évian. Lipa made the announcement on social media, where she stated that "it had been an honor" working with the brand. On 13 August, Lipa released a remix of "Levitating" featuring American artists Madonna and Missy Elliott. It served as the lead single from Club Future Nostalgia, a remix collection of Future Nostalgia tracks by the Blessed Madonna and Mark Ronson, which was released on 28 August. On 2 October 2020, Lipa released the second remix of "Levitating" featuring American rapper DaBaby; on the same day, Lipa released the music video for the second remix. On 14 October 2020, Lipa and Belgian singer Angèle were photographed on the set of a music video. Later in the month, the singers announced the release of their collaboration, "Fever"; it was released on 30 October 2020. It is included on the French re-release of Future Nostalgia. Lipa was featured on "Prisoner", a song from Miley Cyrus' seventh studio album Plastic Hearts. The single was released on 19 November 2020 alongside the music video. In November it was announced that Lipa would be the musical guest on 19 December episode of Saturday Night Live. On 27 November, Lipa performed in a livestream concert titled Studio 2054, where she sang various songs from Future Nostalgia, a new unreleased track with FKA Twigs, as well as some previous singles such as "New Rules", "One Kiss" and "Electricity". The event featured many special guests like the Blessed Madonna, Angèle, Kylie Minogue and Elton John, among others. Future Nostalgia was the most streamed album by a woman (and fifth most streamed album overall) on Spotify in 2020.

On 11 February 2021, Lipa released a single titled "We're Good", along with Future Nostalgia: The Moonlight Edition. On 26 February 2021, Aleyna Tilki released her debut English-language single "Retrograde", co-written by Lipa. Lipa released the song "Can They Hear Us" from the soundtrack of the film Gully on 4 June 2021. On 13 August 2021, Lipa worked again with Elton John on the song "Cold Heart (Pnau remix)", released as the lead single from John's studio album The Lockdown Sessions. On 15 October, the single reached the number one spot on the UK Singles Chart, becoming Lipa's third song to achieve this feat. In February 2022, Lipa launched a weekly lifestyle newsletter entitled Service95 as well as its accompanying podcast Dua Lipa: At Your Service.

On 18 February 2022, a source close to the issue confirmed to Variety that Dua Lipa had parted with her longtime management business, Ben Mawson and Ed Millet's TaP Management. Contrary to other reports, the insider claims that the singer is not currently meeting with other management firms, but she will do so in the future.

On 11 March 2022, Lipa and Megan Thee Stallion released "Sweetest Pie" accompanied by its music video. The song marks their first collaboration and serves as the lead single from Megan's second studio album Traumazine. On 27 May, Lipa collaborated with Calvin Harris and Young Thug to release "Potion", serving as the lead single from Harris's sixth studio album Funk Wav Bounces Vol. 2. It marks the second collaboration between Harris and Lipa following their 2018 single "One Kiss".

Fashion ventures
Lipa has been the cover girl of several magazines. She signed with Next Models. She was in the cover of "Boom Boom Tick" editorial for Elle's January 2016 issue. In April 2016 she was again in an editorial of Elle. She was in a supplement cover of British Vogue in November 2016. She starred an editorial for the January 2017 issue of V. In the same month, she was in the cover for issue 102 of Clash. In March 2017, she became a global ambassador for the American shoe company, Foot Locker, to present women's collections offered by the brand. She was in an editorial for Interview released in April 2017. She modelled for an editorial of Paper, published on 6 June 2017. She was featured in the summer 2017 issue of Teen Vogue in an editorial titled "Fine Tuned". She was in an editorial for June 2017 issue of InStyle. She was in an editorial called "Game Changers" for Fall 2017 issue of V. She was the protagonist of the Fall/Winter 2017–18 advertizing campaign of the Italian brand Patrizia Pepe, as well as recorded a cover of the song "Bang Bang (My Baby Shot Me Down)" (1966) as a soundtrack for the commercial for the said campaign. She was in the cover and an editorial for November 2017 issue of Evening Standard. In the same month, she released her second collaboration with the brand Foot Locker for autumn/winter collection. In January 2018, she was part of a promotional clip for an Adidas Originals campaign called "Original Is Never Finished". She starred the cover of April 2018 issue of Teen Vogue. She was one of the covers for issue 113 of V entitled "The Music Issue", published in May 2018 as a limited edition. She partnered with the fashion brand Nyden on a project to create four clothing collections, but it subsequently failed and Lipa "discontinued" her work with the brand.
 

She was in the cover of British GQ for May 2018 issue. She was in the cover for May 2018 issue of Turkish edition of Vogue. She was in the cover for June 2018 issue of British edition of Elle. In October 2018, she was part of an Adidas campaign called "Here to Create" in which she wore brand clothes. She appeared in a Billboard editorial called "Grammy Preview" alongside Post Malone and Ella Mai. She starred the cover for January 2019 issue of British Vogue and an editorial called "Youth Quake". She was the image for the Pepe Jeans London spring/summer 2019 collection campaign, settling down as the first musician to be global ambassador for the brand. Months later, she launched her first-ever capsule with the same brand for the autumn/winter collection where she designed clothing inspired by the fashion of the 90s and early 2000s and whose decades she spent part of her childhood in London and remembered her mother talking to her in a Pepe Jeans store in Portobello Road; the collection included chain mail dresses, "casual" denim outfits and garments based on Lipa's "style" released in September 2019.

Lipa was in the cover for May 2019 issue of Elle. She starred one of the four covers in the first issue and an editorial of the re-launch of The Face released in September 2019. She was the cover girl of the October 2019 issue and an editorial for the Spanish edition of Vogue. She starred in a Vogue sitcom clip set in the 90s titled "Dua's World" where she wore the "best" collections of New York Fashion Week. She released her second design collaboration with Pepe Jeans London for spring/summer 2020 collection inspired by the fashion of late 1980s and early 1990s whose collection included "oversized" blazers, cropped knitwear, bodycon dresses and "metallic" miniskirts. She was in the cover and an editorial called "True to form" for April 2020 issue of Vogue Australia.
 
She appeared in a Rolling Stone editorial published in April 2020 to discuss about her second studio album Future Nostalgia (2020). She starred the cover of Elle May 2020 issue and an editorial titled "Dua Lipa Gets Physical", and months later she was in the cover for its Canadian and British edition. She was the cover girl for June 2020 issue of GQ on its British edition. She starred one of two covers for W magazine's "The Music Issue" published in September 2020. Lipa released her third design collaboration with Pepe Jeans London for autumn/winter 2020 collection and she stated that it would be her last collaboration with the brand called "Denim decades", which was inspired by every decade since Pepe Jeans started selling denim. In November 2020, she signed a multi-year partnership with Puma becoming the global ambassador of the brand. She was in the cover for December 2020 issue of Attitude. She starred the cover for February 2021 issue of British Vogue. In the same month, she was protagonist of the cover for issue 1348 of Rolling Stone. She was the cover image for March 2021 issue of Time, representing the 100 Next list about the "future 100 most influential people in the world". In the same month, she starred on the cover of The New York Times "Music Issue". She designed her outfit at the 63rd Annual Grammy Awards red carpet featuring a dress in collaboration with the brand Versace inspired by the Aurora Borealis. She protagonised a Puma brand campaign called "She Moves Us" in which she designed a shoe called "Mayze" released in April 2021. In June 2021, Lipa was an announced as the face of Versace's Fall-Winter 2021 campaign.

Dress style and endorsements 
For a Versace dress and Bulgari diamonds she was rated as one of the "best" dressed celebrities of the 61st Annual Grammy Awards ceremony by various media. For her Alexander Wang dress with 90s style, she was rated as one of the "best" dressed celebrities of the 62nd Annual Grammy Awards ceremony. For a Versace dress and Bulgari jewelry she was rated as one of the "best" dressed celebrities of the 63rd Annual Grammy Awards ceremony.

She released a limited edition lip gloss called "Cremesheen Glass" in collaboration with MAC Cosmetics for its campaign called "Future Forward". She became the face of a perfume called "Libre" for a Yves Saint Laurent campaign launched in September 2019 for which she recorded a promo cover of the song "I'm Free" (1965) featured in advertisements for Lipa's campaigns with the brand. Later she was the face of a new version of the same perfume called "Libre Intense". She became an ambassador for the mineral water brand Évian in July 2020. In March 2021 she performed an a cappella of her song "Levitating" (2020) for an advertisement for the "Drink True" campaign of the brand Évian.

Modelling

She made her runway debut at Versace's Spring/Summer 2022 show at Milan Fashion Week which was soundtracked by tracks from her album Future Nostalgia (2020).

Artistry and influences
Lipa has a mezzo-soprano vocal range. Her music is primarily pop, and has also been described as disco, house and R&B. Stylistically, her music has been described as dance-pop, synth-pop, R&B, dream pop, alternative pop, and nu-disco subgenres. Lipa herself describes her musical style as "dark pop". She is also noted for singing in a "distinct, husky, low register", and her "sultry" tone. Regarding her songwriting process, Lipa states she usually comes to the studio with a concept and starts developing the song with her co-writers. She cites Kylie Minogue, Pink, Nelly Furtado, Jamiroquai, Kendrick Lamar and Chance the Rapper amongst her musical influences. "My idea of pop has been P!nk and Christina Aguilera and Destiny's Child and Nelly Furtado", said Lipa in a GQ interview in 2018. Her second studio album Future Nostalgia (2020) was inspired by artists that she listened to during her teens, including Gwen Stefani, Madonna, Moloko, Blondie and Outkast.

Impact 
A study conducted by the Office for National Statistics revealed that the number of people born with the name "Dua" in England and Wales was 63 in 2017, the year Lipa earned her first UK number one song with "New Rules"; this increased to 126 in 2019. In May 2018, she was included on British Vogues inaugural list of the 25 most influential British women of 2018 with Lipa being the youngest on the list at the age of 22. The magazine's review praised her 2017 song "New Rules" as an "anthem of female empowerment [that] laid out a blueprint for modern sex lives", and described her as a "culture definer".

In February 2019, the first wax figure of Lipa was unveiled at Madame Tussauds London, inspired by her appearance during her performance at Glastonbury Festival 2017. Two months later, a second wax figure sculpted of Lipa was unveiled at Madame Tussauds Amsterdam in allusion to her performance at the 2018 Billboard Music Awards.

Lyndsey Havens from Billboard credited Lipa as the protagonist in disco's revival in 2020 through her song "Don't Start Now" (2019). People magazine called her "the Future of Pop" due to the success of her sophomore album, Future Nostalgia. She inspired the French photographer, Hugo Comte, in his first photo-book. She was included in Times 100 Next list on future 100 world's most influential people by Australian singer Kylie Minogue who in her review called Lipa a "shining star". Mark Sutherland and Jem Aswad from Variety rated Lipa as one of the most impactful women in the global entertainment industry.

Accolades and achievements 

Lipa has received several accolades throughout her career, including five Brit Awards from thirteen nominations, one MTV Video Music Award from fifteen nominations, one American Music Award from six nominations, one iHeartRadio Music Award from eight nominations, one Bambi Awards and three Grammy Awards from eight nominations. Lipa has received two Guinness World Records; in 2020 for most tickets sold for a livestreamed concert by a solo female artist, and in 2021 for most monthly listeners on Spotify for a female artist, but without surpassing the all-time peak achieved by Ariana Grande the year prior.

In the media

Political views and advocacy 
Lipa identifies as a feminist. She has spoken out against sexism within the music industry, using social media to raise awareness of women's problems. Lipa has advocated for the social equality amongst the LGBT community. On 12 February 2018, she raised a rainbow flag while performing her song "Be the One" in a presentation at the Hollywood Palladium in Los Angeles as part of The Self-Titled tour. On the 2018 Brit Awards red carpet she wore a white rose dress in support of Time's Up movement. Additionally, at the same event, she stated in her acceptance speech for an award her delight of having "women present in these stages" and more "women winning awards". She explained that her perception of feminism is not about misandry but demanding the same opportunities.

 In September 2018, some fans were removed by security from a Lipa concert in the National Exhibition and Convention Center of Shanghai for allegedly waving rainbow flags, despite homosexuality being decriminalised in China in 1997. In response, Lipa said she was "proud" of and "grateful" to the people who showed their pride at the show. She participated in a short film for an initiative called "Global Feminism", directed by The Circle of Annie Lennox in association with Apple Music and released on 7 March 2019 ahead of International Women's Day. The clip intended to raise awareness of misogyny, rape, and violence against women. In April 2019, she showed her support for LGBT rights in Brunei by calling for a boycott against the hotel interests of the then-Sultan of Brunei, Hassanal Bolkiah, after a penal code punishing homosexuality with death came into force in Brunei. During a Billboard Women in Music event, she used her Powerhouse Award acceptance speech to highlight that women "still have a lot to do for real equality" in which she also complained about the "lack of diversity" amongst the artists of the Billboard Hot 100 and asked the continued encouragement to "all the young girls out there to be the powerhouses of the future."

In November 2018, Lipa expressed dissatisfaction over the withdrawal of the United Kingdom from the European Union due to Brexit because according to her personal experience "no refugee leaves their country without having to". In June 2019, she made public her support for the ongoing Sudanese transition to democracy on social media by sharing a blue image that showed the phrase "Stand with Sudan" where she detailed her rejection of the Khartoum massacre writing about all "women, men and children fighting for a peaceful transition to democracy". She also described the event as: an attempt to "brutal murder and rape" by government forces those who try to call for democracy, a "violation of the freedom rights" of Sudanese citizens for blocking their internet and a "violation of human rights". In December of the same year, Lipa endorsed the Labour Party led by Jeremy Corbyn in the 2019 United Kingdom general election, comparing the policies of both Labour and Conservatives on various issues on social media and affirming that it was "the most important election in a generation". She characterised Boris Johnson's victory in the election as a "total disaster".

Lipa was the headliner party host for the 2020 Sydney Gay and Lesbian Mardi Gras parade and she was part of the parade, before performing several songs. In July 2020 she signed an open letter to the UK government being received by the then Minister for Women and Equalities, Liz Truss, to request the banning of conversion therapy. Dua is in favour of universal health care and wonders why people weren't protesting about it. In addition, she stated that in her country of birth, the United Kingdom, the National Health Service is considered a "right".

In June 2020, Lipa shared an Instagram post that criticised the Israel Defense Forces' treatment of Palestinians and showed Israeli soldiers detaining Palestinian minors. The post also referred to "fake Jews in the Israeli government" and "fake Christians in the mid west [United States]" who, it said, had created Hamas for people to "believe that Hamas is the reason for the decades worth of occupation, oppression, ethnic cleansing, and murder." An Im Tirtzu petition signed by over three thousand people was sent to the Israeli Minister of Defense, Benny Gantz, and the Israeli Minister of Culture and Sport, Hili Tropper, demanding that Lipa's songs be banned from Israeli Army Radio and Galgalatz due to what Im Tirtzu said was "the incitement against IDF soldiers, the antisemitism, the blood libel, conspiracy theories and the blatant lies in the post" shared by Lipa. In response, the Army Radio said that "Galgalatz does not boycott any artist" and "the songs are chosen at the discretion of the editors of each segment."

In July 2020, Lipa supported a campaign called "Let the Music Play" in which she signed an open letter sent to the then-Culture Secretary, Oliver Dowden, calling for support from the government of United Kingdom for the UK's live music industry's economic loss under the COVID-19 pandemic. On 18 July 2020, Lipa shared a post on her Instagram story explaining "why Kosovo is not and will never be Serbia", urging followers to sign a petition which called for Apple to include Kosovo in its mapping services as an independent state. The following day, she published on her social media an image of a banner containing an irredentist map of Greater Albania that reflected parts of Albania, Kosovo, Serbia, Greece and North Macedonia as one nation appended with the definition of the word "autochthonous". As the banner is commonly associated with extreme Albanian nationalism, she received backlash on social media where she was accused of ethnic nationalism and fascism. She subsequently stated that her post had been "misinterpreted" by people who promote ethnic separatism, an ideology that she "completely rejects". In August, she urged her Instagram followers to vote against Donald Trump in the 2020 United States presidential election.

After endorsing, and campaigning for, U.S. Senator Bernie Sanders in the 2020 Democratic primaries, Lipa expressed support for Joe Biden to become the U.S. president at a virtual event aimed at Albanian Americans later that year during the general election season, arguing that the Kosovars "owed" support to Biden because he was against the massacre and ethnic cleansing of Albanians by having supported the NATO bombing of Yugoslavia. In January 2021, she published a call to her Instagram followers to encourage Kosovo citizens to vote in the 2021 Kosovan parliamentary election.

In May 2021, after expressing solidarity for the death of Palestinian civilians due to the Israel–Palestine crisis, Lipa criticised The New York Times for publishing an advertisement characterizing her, along with Bella and Gigi Hadid, as antisemitic.

In July 2021, through her Sunny Hill Foundation, Lipa joined an initiative that was launched by the Municipality of Tirana, called "Adopt a Kindergarten". The aim of the project was to reconstruct a kindergarten that was severely damaged by the 2019 Albania earthquake. She was quoted saying, "The kindergarten will be very beautiful and I am very proud that Sunny Hill Foundation is a part of it. Let's see better things for our country. I am very proud to be Albanian." The kindergarten was completed in October 2021, and was named "Sunny Hill Kindergarten".

In August 2022, Lipa was named an Honorary Ambassador of Kosovo by the President of Kosovo Vjosa Osmani. In response, Lipa wrote that it was an "honour and a privilege to be able to represent my country all over the world" and that she supports the right of Kosovans "to visa liberalization, freedom to travel and to dream big."

On 13 November 2022, Lipa dismissed reports that she was to perform at the opening ceremony of that year's FIFA World Cup and denied ever being involved in any negotiation to perform, calling out the tournament's host country of Qatar for human rights violations.

Philanthropy 
Together with her father Dukagjin, she co-created the Sunny Hill Foundation in 2016 to raise funds to help people in Kosovo experiencing financial difficulties. In August 2018, she organised a festival to raise money for that foundation, called the Sunny Hill Festival. The then-Mayor of Pristina, Shpend Ahmeti, awarded her the Pristina Key, the first time one had been awarded. Lipa went on to host the festival for the second year in 2019, with Miley Cyrus included as part of the performer line-up. In mid-November 2018, Lipa was part of a campaign organised by UNICEF called "Go Blue" in support of children's rights, on the occasion of World Children's Day (20 November). Her contribution consisted of a short video about dressing in blue or displaying the colour blue, with her in a studio re-recording the lyrics of her song "Be the One" (2015). She changed the word "red" to "blue" in the song for the occasion. In December 2018, Lipa participated in a benefit concert for the Ellie Goulding's "Streets of London" annual charity event at Wembley Arena, which "funds specialist support for people who are homeless in London and raises awareness about homelessness." In April 2019, she became an UNICEF supporter during a three-day visit to a camp for refugee children and youth in Beirut, Lebanon. The camp included many uprooted by the conflict in Syria who did not have "adequate" health care or education and Lipa also visited young Palestinians and Syrians in Bourj el-Barajneh refugee camp. She subsequently supported a campaign by her management company with a plan to raise £100,000 to help raise awareness of charities such as The Black Dog and CALM.

She asked for a better mental health care for artists in creative industries, as she was "shocked" to read that "suicide rates amongst women working in the arts are almost 70% higher than in the world population". Lipa described mental health as the "issue of our generation". On 26 November 2019, following the 2019 Albania earthquake, Lipa asked fans for donations and support for victims. To raise funds she co-released a limited edition line of t-shirts called "Pray for Albania" in collaboration with Albanian fashion designers. All proceeds went to families and victims affected by the seismic event. On 15 March 2020, she asked her fans to make donations to the UNHCR agency to deal with COVID-19 pandemic because refugees are "the most vulnerable on this planet" and they "often live in crowded places" with "limited health services". In the same month, she was part of a television special called "Home Fest" on The Late Late Show with James Corden From His Garage with the goal of raising money for CDC and Feed the Children where she performed her song, "Don't Start Now" (2019), from an apartment in London. On 16 May 2020, she did a live performance of her song "Break My Heart" (2020) on the television special Graduate Together: America Honors the High School Class of 2020 aimed at the high school students whose graduation ceremonies and proms were cancelled due to the COVID-19 pandemic. At the end of May 2020, she participated in a digital event called "Dream With Us" with the aim of raising funds, whose event consisted of a streaming concert at which a portion of proceeds would go to organisations that help fight the disease of COVID-19.

She was part of a charitable project organised for BBC Radio 1 for a cover version of "Times Like These" released on 23 April 2020 in the segment Live Lounge. She was part of the charity supergroup Live Lounge Allstars in which each member recorded and filmed their contribution to the song from their respective households to encourage social distancing in which profits from the single would primarily go to Children in Need and Comic Relief, as well as COVID-19 Solidarity Response Fund. She used social media to promove Lebanese citizens to donate blood to victims affected by the 2020 Beirut explosion. She donated 5,000 euros to the Theatre of Dodona so that the venue could have its own ticket system and website. She was part of an initiative organised by Belgian singer Angèle and KickCancer Foundation to fund research against childhood cancer, and it was about a charity raffle in which Lipa offered a manuscript of her song "Don't Start Now" (2019) as a prize. She performed at 2021 Elton John AIDS Foundation Academy Award Party virtually to benefit the AIDS Foundation to combat HIV disease, whose event raised US$3 million.

Copyright lawsuit 
On 1 March 2022, reggae band Artikal Sound System filed a suit against Lipa and her label Warner Records alleging copyright infringement, asserting similarities between "Levitating" and their 2017 song "Live Your Life". A second suit by songwriters L. Russell Brown and Sandy Linzer claimed that "Levitating" infringed on their 1979 disco song "Wiggle and Giggle All Night".

Personal life
Lipa's first name "Dua" was her grandmother's suggestion and means "love" in Albanian. She is occasionally referred to affectionately by fans as "Dula Peep", which originated as a mispronunciation by American talk show host Wendy Williams in 2018. She has since positively embraced the nickname.

Lipa's native language is Albanian, though she was born and mostly raised in London and has a London accent when speaking English.

In 2013, Lipa began an on-again, off-again relationship with English chef Isaac Carew, with the two first splitting up in February 2017. She dated American singer Paul Klein, the former frontman of LANY, from August 2017 to January 2018. She then resumed her relationship with Carew from January 2018 to June 2019. In June 2019, she began a relationship with American model Anwar Hadid, and the two broke up in December 2021.

Lipa has described herself as an "Honorary Liverpool supporter", after her song "One Kiss" was adopted by the football club's fans in the wake of her performance at the 2018 UEFA Champions League final, since becoming a Reds anthem after significant Liverpool victories. 

On 27 November 2022, Lipa was granted Albanian citizenship by president Bajram Begaj, one day before the country's 110th independence celebrations.

Discography

 Dua Lipa (2017)
 Future Nostalgia (2020)

Filmography

Tours
Headlining
 The Self-Titled Tour (2017–2018)
 Future Nostalgia Tour (2022)

Promotional
 2016 UK Tour (2016)
 Hotter Than Hell Tour (2016)
 US and Europe Tour (2017)

Opening act
 Troye Sivan – Suburbia Tour (2016)
 Bruno Mars – 24K Magic World Tour (2017–2018)
 Coldplay – A Head Full of Dreams Tour (2017)

See also

 List of mezzo-sopranos in non-classical music
 List of most-followed Instagram accounts
 List of most-streamed artists on Spotify

Notes

References

Further reading

External links

 
 
 

 
1995 births
Living people
21st-century English women singers
Music YouTubers
Albanian YouTuber
British YouTubers
YouTubers from London
APRA Award winners
Brit Award winners
British contemporary R&B singers
British disco musicians
British women fashion designers
British women's rights activists
Children's rights activists
English women pop singers
English women singer-songwriters
English house musicians
English human rights activists
English mezzo-sopranos
English people of Albanian descent
English people of Bosnia and Herzegovina descent
English people of Kosovan descent
English women in electronic music
Feminist musicians
Grammy Award winners
English LGBT rights activists
Musicians from Pristina
NME Awards winners
People from West Hampstead
Singers from London
Vertigo Records artists
Warner Records artists
Women human rights activists
Writers from Pristina
21st-century Albanian women singers
Albanian pop singers
Albanian songwriters
Albanian human rights activists
Albanian mezzo-sopranos
Albanian people of Bosnia and Herzegovina descent
Albanian people of Kosovan descent
Albanian LGBT rights activists